The following ships of the Indian Navy have been named Jamuna:

 was formerly the  sloop HMIS Jumna commissioned in 1941
 a hydrographic survey ship commissioned in 1991

Indian Navy ship names